Zamanabad (also Romanized as Zamānābād) is a village in Piveh Zhan Rural District, Ahmadabad District, Mashhad County, Razavi Khorasan Province, Iran. At the 2006 census, its population was 26, in 8 families.

References 

Populated places in Mashhad County